The Vengeance class was a type of large sailing frigates designed by Pierre Degay and built in Paimbœuf for the French Navy. Rated at 48 guns, the type was one of the French attempts at increasing the firepower of frigates by mounting a 24-pounder main battery, as was tried with Forfait's . The attempt was unsuccessful, and the ships mounted 18-pounder long guns on their main gun deck while in service.

Only two ships of the design were built, both being captured by the British and recommissioned in the Royal Navy.

 
Builder: Paimbœuf
Begun:June 1793
Launched: 8 November 1794
Completed: By April 1795
Fate: captured on 20 August 1800 by the Royal Navy. Sold in 1814.

 
Builder: Paimbœuf
Begun: April 1794
Launched: 28 November 1795
Completed: May 1796
Fate: captured on 9 March 1797 by the Royal Navy. Sold in 1814.

References

Frigate classes
Sailing frigates of the French Navy
 
Ship classes of the French Navy